Bank of Industry Limited (abbreviated as 'BOI') is Nigeria's oldest and largest Development Finance Institution (DFI) currently operating. It is owned by the Ministry of Finance Incorporated (MOFI) Nigeria (94.80%), the Central Bank of Nigeria (CBN) (5.19%) and private shareholders (0.01%). The bank has 11 members on its board and it is chaired by Aliyu Abdulrahman Dikko.

History 

Bank of Industry Limited began operations in 1959 as the Investment Corporation of Nigeria (ICON) Limited. In 1964, ICON Limited was reconstituted to become the Nigerian Industrial Development Bank (NIDB) Limited under the guidance of the World Bank. Initially, International Finance Corporation (IFC) held 75% equity in NIDB and produced the first Managing Director. However, the equity structure was diluted in 1976 as a result of the indigenization decree.

In 2001, the BOI was reconstructed out of the merger of the Nigerian Industrial Development Bank (NIDB), Nigerian Bank for Commerce and Industry (NBCI) and the National Economic Reconstruction Fund (NERFUND). Although the bank's share capital was initially set at ₦50 billion in the wake of NIDB's reconstruction, it was increased to ₦250 billion in 2007.

Operations

The bank has been instrumental in administering the ₦300 billion Power and Aviation Intervention Fund and ₦50 billion Cotton, Textile and Garments Intervention Fund from the CBN, $200 million Nigerian Content Intervention fund (NCI Fund), ₦2.5 billion Nigerian Artisanal and Small-Scale Miners (ASM) Finance Support Fund amongst other funds. BOI also manages and disburses the Government Enterprise and Empowerment Program (GEEP), one of a number of social intervention programmes introduced by the Federal Government of Nigeria. GEEP (also known as MarketMoni) is a ₦140 billion fund aimed at supporting individuals in the informal sector with loans at zero percent interest rate. Through the fund, BOI supports trade cooperatives, women cooperatives, micro-enterprises and trade associations with loans ranging from ₦10,000 to ₦50,000.

As part of efforts to expand financing opportunities, BOI began partnerships with several state governments under a matching fund scheme. The MSME matching fund is a 50:50 counterpart funding scheme with State Governments to administer the fund for establishing micro, small or medium scale businesses in participating states.

Strategic Partnerships

Collaboration with Federal Ministry of Mines and Steel Development
In 2017, the Federal Ministry of Mines and Steel Development (FMMSD) set up a ₦2.5 billion Nigerian Artisanal and Small-Scale Miners (ASM) Finance Support Fund and designated BOI as the sole fund manager. The purpose of the ASM Fund is to address the funding requirements of artisanal and small-scale miners while promoting the development of solid minerals potentials in Nigeria. Through the scheme, artisanal miners can access up to ₦10 million while small-scale miners can access up to ₦100 million.

BOI-UNDP Solar Energy Programme 
In 2011, BOI and United Nations Development Programme (UNDP) launched the Access to Renewable Energy Project. The project was set up to serve as an advocacy and awareness programme to promote and support the expansion of renewable energy services to support households and local enterprises in unserved and underserved communities. To achieve this, BOI and UNDP encouraged stakeholders in the renewable energy space to invest in the Nigerian sector. However, in 2015, the project was refocused to align with BOI's strategy to fund and implement renewable energy projects in collaboration with relevant stakeholders. As a result, the project was renamed to the Solar Energy Programme (SEP) to reflect the change in strategic direction.

The SEP commenced with a Rural Electrification Project which involved the provision of long term financing for the installation of low cost micro-grid and stand-alone solar energy solutions in nominated off-grid rural communities. Between 2015 and 2016, micro-grid and stand-alone solar energy solutions were installed in 6 off-grid rural communities in 6 Nigerian States: Niger State, Osun State, Gombe State, Anambra State, Edo State and Kaduna State. Pre-paid metres, using Pay-As-You-Go models, were installed in each household and microenterprise to accommodate for flexibility of payment and to solve challenges of unpaid bills. The pilot phase was considered a success and also attracted several potential investors across Nigeria.

On the back of this success, BOI and UNDP entered into a cost-sharing agreement to fund the second phase of the project. In 2016, BOI provided $1.4 million debt financing while UNDP provided $600,000 grant to replicate the solar energy solutions in 11 additional off-grid communities across 4 Nigerian States: Niger State, Gombe State, Anambra State and Kaduna State.

In view of the benefits of the SEP, BOI introduced a ₦2 billion Solar Energy commercial product in 2017 to be accessed by various categories of end users both directly through BOI and indirectly.

Through the Solar Energy Programme, the bank aims to power more than 100,000 off-grid households and microenterprises in rural and commercial communities by 2021.

Collaboration with African Development Bank (AfDB) Group 
In 2011, the Board of Directors of African Development Bank (AfDB) Group approved $500 million multi-tranche line of credit to assist BOI in financing local SMEs Nigeria. In 2015 and 2017, the bank received $100 million (in two tranches of $50 million each) to fund export-oriented SMEs with the capacity to generate foreign exchange. The line of credit would be provided for funding projects aimed at systematic poverty reduction, employment generation and wealth creation through entrepreneurial, social and economic development. As part of the agreement, AfDB required the bank provide technical assistance for capacity building for both BOI and SMEs. To this end, BOI enlisted international companies BDO/GBRW.

Branches

The Bank of Industry has a strong branch network across Nigeria with 24 branches, a headquarters in Lagos State, Nigeria and a corporate office in Abuja, Nigeria.

 Abia State
 Abuja, Federal Capital Territory
 Anambra State
 Bauchi State
 Benue State
 Borno State
 Cross River State
 Delta State
 Enugu State
 Gombe State
 Kaduna State
 Kano State
 Katsina State
 Kebbi State
 Kwara State
 Lagos State
 Niger State
 Ogun State
 Ondo State
 Osun State
 Oyo State
 Rivers State
 Sokoto State
 Taraba State

Subsidiaries

BOI-Investment Trust Company (BOI-ITC) 
BOI Investment and Trust Company Limited (BOI-ITC) was established in 1978 as a wholly owned subsidiary of BOI's predecessor, Nigerian Industrial Development Bank (NIDB). It was set up as a capital market operator to function as a trustee, registrar and fund/portfolio manager. The company is also registered with the CBN as a finance company. As a Trustee, BOI-ITC is engaged in the specialised business of trust services including private and public trust, employment retirement benefits, trust fund management for both private and corporate bodies, estate administration under trust, and executorships among other related services.

BOI-Microfinance Bank Limited (BOI-MFB) 
The BOI-Microfinance Bank Limited is a limited liability company duly incorporated in Nigeria under the 2002 Companies and Allied Matters Act and regulated by CBN. The bank offers a broad range of financial services to micro, small and medium-sized enterprises and various low-income earners both as individuals and as groups. It offers asset financing loans, working capital loans, consumer loans and group loan which do not exceed ₦500,000 per enterprise. In addition, BOI-MFB aims to encourage savings among the unbanked productive poor of the Nigerian society.

BOI-MFB is a major vehicle in delivering on the objectives of the BOI Bottom of the Pyramid Scheme (BOP).

BOI Insurance Brokers (BOI-IB) Limited 
BOI Industrial and Development Insurance Brokers (BOI-IB) Limited offers insurance and consultancy services. BOI-IB Limited provides organisations with fire/extraneous perils insurance, burglary/housebreaking insurance, consequential loss, machinery breakdown, money insurance, goods in transit, group personal accident, public liability, fidelity guarantee, marine insurance and automobile (motor) insurance.

BOI-IB limited also provides insurance cover for BOI loans and services.

LECON Financial Services 
LECON Financial Services, formerly Leasing Company of Nigeria Limited, was established as a wholly owned subsidiary of Bank of Industry Limited (BOI), formerly Nigerian Industrial Development Bank Limited, (NIDB) in 1989. It was set up to augment the activities of BOI by providing ancillary facilities to loan beneficiaries of the bank.

References

Development finance institutions
Banks of Nigeria
Companies based in Lagos
Banks established in 1959